The 2015 Tour de Wallonie was a five-stage men's professional road cycling race. It was the forty-second running of the Tour de Wallonie. The race started on 25 July in Frasnes-lez-Anvaing, finishing on 29 July in Waremme.

Teams
The sixteen teams invited to participate in the Tour de Wallonie were:

Stages

Classification leadership

References

External links
 
 

Tour de Wallonie
Tour de Wallonie
Tour de Wallonie